General Muhammadu Buhari became head of state after a coup d'état on 31 December 1983 which ended the Nigerian Second Republic. He was replaced by General Ibrahim Babangida in a coup d'état on 27 August 1985.

1980s in Nigeria
Nigerian military governors